The scientific school of Quantum electrochemistry began to form in the 1960s under Revaz Dogonadze. Generally speaking, the field comprises the notions arising in electrodynamics, quantum mechanics, and electrochemistry; and so is studied by a very large array of different professional researchers. The fields they reside in include, chemical, electrical and mechanical engineering, chemistry and physics.

More specifically, quantum electrochemistry is the application of quantum mechanical tools such as density functional theory to the study of electrochemical processes, including electron transfer at electrodes. It also includes Marcus theory and quantum rate theory, the latter being a method of describing electrochemistry using first principle quantum mechanics and concepts of conductance quantum and quantum capacitance.

History and contributors 
The first development of "quantum electrochemistry" is somewhat difficult to pin down. This is not very surprising, since the development of quantum mechanics to chemistry can be summarized as the application of quantum wave theory models to atoms and molecules. This being the case, electrochemistry, which is particularly concerned with the electronic states of some particular system, is already, by its nature, tied into the quantum mechanical model of the electron in quantum chemistry. There were proponents of quantum electrochemistry, who applied quantum mechanics to electrochemistry with unusual zeal, clarity and precision. Among them were Revaz Dogonadze and his co-workers. They developed one of the early quantum mechanical models for proton transfer reactions in chemical systems. Dogonadze is a particularly celebrated promoter of quantum electrochemistry, and is also credited with forming an international summer school of quantum electrochemistry centered in Yugoslavia. He was a main author of the Quantum-Mechanical Theory of Kinetics of the Elementary Act of Chemical, Electrochemical and Biochemical Processes in Polar Liquids. Another important contributor is Rudolph A. Marcus, who won the Nobel Prize in Chemistry in 1992 for his Theory of Electron Transfer Reactions in Chemical Systems. Recently, Marcus theory has been shown to be part of a more general concept associated with the quantum rate theory, a theory that predicts the rate of electron transfer (electrochemistry being a particular case) using the concepts of conductance quantum and quantum capacitance.

See also 

 Electrochemistry
 Quantum chemistry
 Quantum mechanics

References 

 R.R. Dogonadze, "Theory of Molecular Electrode Kinetics", in: N.S. Hush (Ed.), Reactions of Molecules at Electrodes, Interscience Pub., London, 1971, pp. 135-227
 R.R. Dogonadze and Z.D. Urushadze, "Semi-classical Method of Calculation of Rates of Chemical Reactions".- J.Electroanal. Chem., 32, 1971, pp. 235-245
 R.P. Bell, "The Proton in Chemistry", Chapman and Hall, London-New York, 1973
 N.R. Kestner, J. Logan and J. Jortner, "Thermal Electron Transfer Reactions in Polar Solvents".- J.Phys. Chem., 78, 1974, pp. 2148-2166
 R.R. Dogonadze, A.M. Kuznetsov, M.G. Zaqaraya and J. Ulstrup, "A Quantum Theory of Low-Temperature Chemical and Biological Rate Processes", in: B. Chance, R.A. Marcus, D. DeVault, H. Frauenfelder, J.R. Schrieffer and N. Sutin (Eds.), Tunneling in Biological Systems, Academic Press, New York, 1979, pp. 145-171
 R.P. Bell, "The Tunneling Effect in Chemistry", Chapman and Hall, London-New York, 1980
 R.R. Dogonadze and A.M. Kuznetsov, "Quantum Electrochemical Kinetics: Continuum Theory", in: B.E. Conway, J.O'M. Bockris and E. Yeager (Eds.), Comprehensive Treatise of Electrochemistry, Vol. 7, Plenum Press, New York, 1983, pp. 1-40
 "Electrodynamics and Quantum Phenomena at Interfaces" (Proceedings of the International Conference, Telavi, Georgia, October 1-6, 1984), Publishing House "Metsniereba", Tbilisi, 1986, 558 pp. (in English)
 J.O'M. Bockris, Shahed U.M. Khan, "Quantum Electrochemistry", Plenum Press, New York, 1979, 538 pp.
 "Standard bearer of Quantum Electrochemistry" ("Flagman Kvantovoy Elektrokhimii"). About Professor Revaz R. Dogonadze. Compiled by Prof. Z.D. Urushadze, Publishing House of the Tbilisi State University, Tbilisi, 1991, 140 pp. (In Russian)
 M. Bixon and J. Jortner, "Electron Transfer. From Isolated Molecules to Biomolecules".- Adv. in Chem. Physics, 106, 1999, pp. 35-203
 "Encyclopedia of Electrochemistry", Vol. 2, Interfacial Kinetics and Mass Transport, Wiley Publishers, 2003, 563 pp..
 Revaz Dogonadze Memorial Issue of the Journal of Electroanalytical Chemistry and Interfacial Electrochemistry, vol. 204, Lausanne, 1986.

External links 

 Nobel Lecture of Rudolph A. Marcus, 1992
 R.R. Dogonadze's Memorial Page
 International Society of Electrochemistry (ISE)

Electrochemistry
Electrochemistry